Scheps may refer to:
People
Andrew Scheps, US audio engineer
Frida Scheps Weinstein, French author
Gustavo Scheps, Uruguayan architect
Ilja Scheps, German-Russian pianist
Joëlle Scheps, Dutch swimmer
Johan Scheps, Dutch politician
Olga Scheps, German-Russian pianist
Samuel Scheps, Polish-Swiss Zionist activist
Geography
Scheps, a village in the Belgian municipality of Balen
Scheps, a natural landscape in Belgian municipality of Balen
Other
Scheps v Fine Art Logistics Ltd, a 2007 English contract law case
Scheps, a Bavarian beer style